The International Union of Pure and Applied Chemistry (IUPAC ) is an international federation of National Adhering Organizations working for the advancement of the chemical sciences, especially by developing nomenclature and terminology. It is a member of the International Science Council (ISC). IUPAC is registered in Zürich, Switzerland, and the administrative office, known as the "IUPAC Secretariat", is in Research Triangle Park, North Carolina, United States. This administrative office is headed by IUPAC's executive director, currently Lynn Soby.

IUPAC was established in 1919 as the successor of the International Congress of Applied Chemistry for the advancement of chemistry. Its members, the National Adhering Organizations, can be national chemistry societies, national academies of sciences, or other bodies representing chemists. There are fifty-four National Adhering Organizations and three Associate National Adhering Organizations. IUPAC's Inter-divisional Committee on Nomenclature and Symbols (IUPAC nomenclature) is the recognized world authority in developing standards for the naming of the chemical elements and compounds. Since its creation, IUPAC has been run by many different committees with different responsibilities. These committees run different projects which include standardizing nomenclature, finding ways to bring chemistry to the world, and publishing works.

IUPAC is best known for its works standardizing nomenclature in chemistry, but IUPAC has publications in many science fields including chemistry, biology and physics. Some important work IUPAC has done in these fields includes standardizing nucleotide base sequence code names; publishing books for environmental scientists, chemists, and physicists; and improving education in science. IUPAC is also known for standardizing the atomic weights of the elements through one of its oldest standing committees, the Commission on Isotopic Abundances and Atomic Weights (CIAAW).

Creation and history 

The need for an international standard for chemistry was first addressed in 1860 by a committee headed by German scientist Friedrich August Kekulé von Stradonitz. This committee was the first international conference to create an international naming system for organic compounds. The ideas that were formulated in that conference evolved into the official IUPAC nomenclature of organic chemistry. IUPAC stands as a legacy of this meeting, making it one of the most important historical international collaborations of chemistry societies. Since this time, IUPAC has been the official organization held with the responsibility of updating and maintaining official organic nomenclature. IUPAC as such was established in 1919. One notable country excluded from this early IUPAC is Germany. Germany's exclusion was a result of prejudice towards Germans by the Allied powers after World War I. Germany was finally admitted into IUPAC during 1929. However, Nazi Germany was removed from IUPAC during World War II.

During World War II, IUPAC was affiliated with the Allied powers, but had little involvement during the war effort itself. After the war, East and West Germany were readmitted to IUPAC in 1973. Since World War II, IUPAC has been focused on standardizing nomenclature and methods in science without interruption.

In 2016, IUPAC denounced the use of chlorine as a chemical weapon. The organization pointed out their concerns in a letter to Ahmet Üzümcü, the director of the Organisation for the Prohibition of Chemical Weapons (OPCW), in regards to the practice of utilizing chlorine for weapon usage in Syria among other locations. The letter stated, "Our organizations deplore the use of chlorine in this manner. The indiscriminate attacks, possibly carried out by a member state of the Chemical Weapons Convention (CWC), is of concern to chemical scientists and engineers around the globe and we stand ready to support your mission of implementing the CWC." According to the CWC, "the use, stockpiling, distribution, development or storage of any chemical weapons is forbidden by any of the 192 state party signatories."

Committees and governance 
IUPAC is governed by several committees that all have different responsibilities. The committees are as follows: Bureau, CHEMRAWN (Chem Research Applied to World Needs) Committee, Committee on Chemistry Education, Committee on Chemistry and Industry, Committee on Printed and Electronic Publications, Evaluation Committee, Executive Committee, Finance Committee, Interdivisional Committee on Terminology, Nomenclature and Symbols, Project Committee, and Pure and Applied Chemistry Editorial Advisory Board. Each committee is made up of members of different National Adhering Organizations from different countries.

The steering committee hierarchy for IUPAC is as follows:
 All committees have an allotted budget to which they must adhere.
 Any committee may start a project.
 If a project's spending becomes too much for a committee to continue funding, it must take the issue to the Project Committee.
 The project committee either increases the budget or decides on an external funding plan.
 The Bureau and Executive Committee oversee operations of the other committees.

Nomenclature 

IUPAC committee has a long history of officially naming organic and inorganic compounds. IUPAC nomenclature is developed so that any compound can be named under one set of standardized rules to avoid duplicate names. The first publication on IUPAC nomenclature of organic compounds was A Guide to IUPAC Nomenclature of Organic Compounds in 1900, which contained information from the International Congress of Applied Chemistry.

Basic spellings 
IUPAC establishes rules for harmonized spelling of some chemicals to reduce variation among different local English-language variants. For example, they recommend "aluminium" rather than "aluminum", "sulfur" rather than "sulphur", and "caesium" rather than "cesium".

Organic nomenclature 

IUPAC organic nomenclature has three basic parts: the substituents, carbon chain length, and chemical affix. The substituents are any functional groups attached to the main carbon chain. The main carbon chain is the longest possible continuous chain. The chemical affix denotes what type of molecule it is. For example, the ending ane denotes a single bonded carbon chain, as in "hexane".

Another example of IUPAC organic nomenclature is cyclohexanol:

 The substituent name for a ring compound is cyclo.
 The indication (substituent name) for a six carbon chain is hex.
 The chemical ending for a single bonded carbon chain is ane.
 The chemical ending for an alcohol is ol.
 The two chemical endings are combined for an ending of anol indicating a single bonded carbon chain with an alcohol attached to it.

Inorganic nomenclature 

Basic IUPAC inorganic nomenclature has two main parts: the cation and the anion. The cation is the name for the positively charged ion and the anion is the name for the negatively charged ion.

An example of IUPAC nomenclature of inorganic chemistry is potassium chlorate (KClO3):

 "Potassium" is the cation name.
 "Chlorate" is the anion name.

Amino acid and nucleotide base codes 
IUPAC also has a system for giving codes to identify amino acids and nucleotide bases. IUPAC needed a coding system that represented long sequences of amino acids. This would allow for these sequences to be compared to try to find homologies. These codes can consist of either a one-letter code or a three-letter code.

These codes make it easier and shorter to write down the amino acid sequences that make up proteins. The nucleotide bases are made up of purines (adenine and guanine) and pyrimidines (cytosine and thymine or uracil). These nucleotide bases make up DNA and RNA. These nucleotide base codes make the genome of an organism much smaller and easier to read.

The codes for amino acids (24 amino acids and three special codes) are:

Publications

Non-series books

Experimental Thermodynamics book series 
The Experimental Thermodynamics books series covers many topics in the fields of thermodynamics.

Series of books on analytical and physical chemistry of environmental systems

Colored cover book and website series (nomenclature) 

IUPAC color code their books in order to make each publication distinguishable.

International Year of Chemistry 

IUPAC and UNESCO were the lead organizations coordinating events for the International Year of Chemistry, which took place in 2011. The International Year of Chemistry was originally proposed by IUPAC at the general assembly in Turin, Italy. This motion was adopted by UNESCO at a meeting in 2008. The main objectives of the International Year of Chemistry were to increase public appreciation of chemistry and gain more interest in the world of chemistry. This event is also being held to encourage young people to get involved and contribute to chemistry. A further reason for this event being held is to honour how chemistry has made improvements to everyone's way of life.

IUPAC Presidents 
IUPAC Presidents are elected by the IUPAC Council during the General Assembly. Below is the list of IUPAC Presidents since its inception in 1919.

See also 

 CAS registry number
 Chemical nomenclature
 Commission on Isotopic Abundances and Atomic Weights
 European Association for Chemical and Molecular Sciences
 Institute for Reference Materials and Measurements (IRMM)
 International Chemical Identifier (InChI)
 International Union of Biochemistry and Molecular Biology (IUBMB)
 International Union of Pure and Applied Physics (IUPAP)
 List of chemical elements naming controversies
 National Institute of Standards and Technology (NIST)
 Simplified molecular-input line-entry system (SMILES)

References

External links 
 

Chemical nomenclature
Chemistry organizations
International scientific organizations
Members of the International Council for Science
Organisations based in Zürich
Organizations based in North Carolina
Scientific organizations based in the United States
Scientific organisations based in Switzerland
Scientific organizations established in 1919
Standards organisations in Switzerland
Members of the International Science Council